Lest We Forget is a 1934 British drama film directed by John Baxter and starring Stewart Rome, George Carney and Esmond Knight. It was made as a quota quickie at Shepperton Studios.

Cast
 Stewart Rome as Captain Rayner  
 George Carney as Sergeant Jock  
 Esmond Knight as Pat Doyle Jr.  
 Ann Yates as Sylvia Rayner  
 Roddy Hughes as Taffy  
 Tony Quinn as Pat Doyle  
 Wilson Coleman as Butler

References

Bibliography
 Chibnall, Steve. Quota Quickies: The Birth of the British 'B' Film. British Film Institute, 2007.
 Low, Rachael. Filmmaking in 1930s Britain. George Allen & Unwin, 1985.
 Wood, Linda. British Films, 1927-1939. British Film Institute, 1986.

External links

1934 films
British drama films
1934 drama films
1930s English-language films
Films directed by John Baxter
Quota quickies
Films shot at Shepperton Studios
British black-and-white films
1930s British films